Too Dirt For TV2 – Niggas Is Men is a 2013 mixtape album by American rapper and producer Quelle Chris. It featured audio production handled by Messiah Musik, Sifu and Quelle himself, and guest appearances from Bwameeks, Cavalier, Chay, Denmark Vessey, DJ GroWeyez, Fresh Daily, Mosel, and Tanya Morgan.

Background 

Niggas Is Men is Quelle's debut full-length with Tucson, Arizona-based independent label Mello Music Group. Also it is the second album of Quelle's ongoing 'too dirt for TV' series, following up to his 2012 release of 2Dirt4TV and preceding his 2015 release of Innocent Country.

The record was released on March 19, 2013 for sale digitally, on April 30, 2013 on CD and vinyl, and distributed by Fat Beats.

Track listing 

Notes
"Green Eyes" contains samples from "Soul Girl" by Ahmad Jamal (1973) and "Treat 'Em Right" by Chubb Rock (1990)
"In Retrograde" contains samples from "Spell" by Blue Magic (1974)

Personnel 

 André Trenier – artwork
 Chris Keys – guest vocals (track 14)
 Denmark Vessey – guest vocals (track 7)
 Devon Callender – guest vocals (track 6)
 Donald Freeman – guest vocals (track 6)
 Gavin Christopher Tennille – main artist, executive producer, producer (tracks 1, 3-4, 7, 9, 11-12, 14)
 Ilyas Nashid – guest vocals (track 6)
 Michael Richardson – guest vocals (tracks 5-7)
 Michael Tolle – executive producer
 Bwameeks – guest vocals (track 4)
 Cavalier – guest vocals (tracks 2-8, 10-11, 13)
 Chay – guest vocals (track 5)
 DJ Groweyez – guest vocals (track 1)
 Messiah Musik – producer (tracks 2, 6, 8-10)
 Mosel – guest vocals (track 11)
 P.U.D.G.E. - guest vocals (track 14)
 Sifu – producer (tracks 5, 13)

References 

2013 mixtape albums
Mello Music Group albums
Albums produced by Quelle Chris